Stigmatella is a bacterium genus in the phylum Myxococcota.

Etymology 
The name Stigmatella derives from:Latin neuter gender noun stigma -atis, brand, mark; Latin feminine gender dim. ending -ella; New Latin feminine gender noun Stigmatella, small dark spot.

Species 
The genus contains three species (including basonyms and synonyms), namely
 S. aurantiaca Berkeley and Curtis 1875 ((Type species of the genus).; New Latin feminine gender adjective aurantiaca, orange colored.)
 S. erecta (Schroeter 1886) McCurdy 1971 (Latin feminine gender participle adjective erecta (from Latin v. erigo), erected, raised.)
 S. hybrida Reichenbach 2007 (Latin feminine gender adjective hybrida, half-breed, bastard.)

Phylogeny
The currently accepted taxonomy is based on the List of Prokaryotic names with Standing in Nomenclature (LPSN) and National Center for Biotechnology Information (NCBI)

See also 
 Bacterial taxonomy
 Microbiology
 List of bacterial orders
 List of bacteria genera

References 

Myxococcota
Bacteria genera